Denis Sergeevich Aksenov (born 23 December 1986, in Moscow) is a Russian political and public figure. Since 11 September 2017, Aksenov has served as the municipal Deputy of the Moscow district Perovo and is former chairman of the youth chamber at the Moscow City Duma.

Biography 
Denis Aksenov was born on 23 December 1986 in Moscow. He graduated from Moscow Polytechnic University specializing as an engineer-technologist. From April 2011 to December 2015, Aksenov worked in Khrunichev State Research and Production Space Center.

Since 2015, he is a public adviser to the head of the district Council Perovo Alexander Dovgopol and was also appointed to the position of chairman of the youth chamber of Perovo. In the summer of 2016, he was a member of the celebrations for Environment Day. On 24 January 2017, he was a member of the ecology exhibition in Moscow City Duma. In September 2017, he was elected Deputy of the Moscow district of Perovo for a period of 5 years as part of the United Russia party. On 21 December 2017, together with the Deputy of the Moscow city, Duma Zoya Zotova, raided on Christmas bazaars.

References 

1986 births
Living people
United Russia politicians
Deputies of Moscow City Duma